The Olimpik-Shuvalan 2009–10 season was Olimpik-Shuvalan's fifth Azerbaijan Premier League season and their first season with Nazim Suleymanov as manager. They participated in the 2009–10 Azerbaijan Premier League as well as the 2009–10 Azerbaijan Cup, finishing the league in 7th place and being knocked out of the Cup at the Semifinal stage by Khazar Lankaran.

Squad

Transfers

Summer

In:

 
 
 
 
 
 
 
 
 
 
 

Out:

Winter

In:

 
 
 
 

Out:

Competitions

Azerbaijan Premier League

Results

Table

Azerbaijan Premier League Relegation Group

Results

Table

Azerbaijan Cup

Squad statistics

Appearances and goals

|-
|colspan="14"|Players who appeared for AZAL and left during the season:

|}

Goal scorers

References
Qarabağ have played their home games at the Tofiq Bahramov Stadium since 1993 due to the ongoing situation in Quzanlı.

External links 
 AZAL PFC Official Web Site
 AZAL PFC  at PFL.AZ
 AZAL PFC Official Facebook Page

AZAL PFC seasons
AZAL